William Welsh (February 9, 1870 – July 16, 1946) was an American actor of the silent era. He appeared in 153 films between 1912 and 1936. He was born in Philadelphia, Pennsylvania, and died in Los Angeles, California at age 76.

Selected filmography

 Robespierre (1913) - Dumont
 Traffic in Souls (1913) - William Trubus
 Neptune's Daughter (1914) - King Neptune
 Courtmartialed (1915) - General Bleirot
 The White Terror (1915) - David Duncan
 Conscience (1915) - John Benson
 Thou Shalt Not Lie (1915, Short) - Fred Wales
 The Primrose Path (1915) - Cartwright
 The Lords of High Decision (1916) - Walsh
 Autumn (1916)
 Elusive Isabel (1916) - Chief Campbell
 The Narrow Path (1916) - Bessie's Father
 Two Seats at the Opera (1916, Short) - Dr. Jones
 The Foolish Virgin (1916) - Jim's father
 20,000 Leagues Under the Sea (1916) - Charles Denver
 The Eternal Sin (1917) - Gubetta
 Parentage (1917) - John Brown
 Bull's Eye (1917, Serial) - John North
 The Heart of Humanity (1918) - Prussian Officer
 The Little Diplomat (1919) - Bradley West
 Trailed by Three (1920) - Aboto
 Cynthia of the Minute (1920) - Mr. Acklin
 Over the Hill to the Poorhouse (1920) - Pa Benton
 Dangerous Love (1920)
 A Man from Nowhere (1920) - George Ainslee
 Crossed Clues (1921, Short)
 The Man Tamer (1921) - Circus Manager
 Reputation (1921) - Max Gossman
 Luring Lips (1921) - James Tierney
 Short Skirts (1921) - Woodward Christie
 The Secret Four (1921)
 Orphans of the Storm (1921) -  Role (uncredited)
 With Stanley in Africa (1922)
 The Scrapper (1922) - Dan McCarthy
 Top o' the Morning (1922) - Dermott O'Donnell
 The Lone Hand (1922) - Al Sheridan
 Ridin' Wild (1922) - John Henderson
 The Flirt (1922) - George Carroll
 Around the World in 18 Days (1923, Serial) - Matthew Harlow
 The Social Buccaneer (1923) - Raymond Norton
 The Town Scandal (1923) - Samuel Grimes
 Dead Game (1923) - Harlu
 Burning Words (1923) - John Malcolm
 Trifling with Honor (1923) - Warden
 The Shock (1923) - Mischa Hadley
 Shootin' for Love (1923) - Bill Randolph
 Shadows of the North (1923) - Jeffrey Neilson
 Beasts of Paradise (1923)
 The Ramblin' Kid (1923) - Lafe Dorsey
 The Red Warning (1923) - George Ainslee
 The Man from Wyoming (1924) - David Messiter
 The Law Forbids (1924) - Lawyer for the Plaintiff
 Excitement (1924) - Hiram Lyons
 The Iron Man (1924, Serial)
 The Price She Paid (1924) - General Lemuel Sidall
 The Western Wallop (1924) - Italian convict
 Flying Hoofs (1925) - Banker Conner
 The Fighting Ranger (1925, Serial) - John Marshall
 Don Dare Devil (1925) - José Remado
 The Red Rider (1925) - Ben Hanfer
 Fighting the Flames (1925) - Charlie Ryan
 The White Outlaw (1925) - Malcolm Gale
 Two-Fisted Jones (1925) - Henry Mortimer
 Western Pluck (1926) - 'Dynamite' Dyer
 The Demon (1926) - Percival Wade
 The Set-Up (1926) - Sheriff Hayes
 Frenzied Flames (1926) - Captain Meagan
 The Man from the West (1926) - Bill Hayes
 Obey The Law (1926) - The Father
 Wandering Girls (1927) - James Marston
 Paying the Price (1927) - Thomas Gordon
 Hills of Peril (1927) - Grimes
 The Western Rover (1927) - Alexander Seaton
 Chain Lightning (1927) - George Clearwater
 The Isle of Forgotten Women (1927) - Mr. Paine
 The Opening Night (1927) - Fisherman
 Daredevil's Reward (1928) - James Powell
 The Head of the Family (1928) - Daniel Sullivan
 Lightning Speed (1928) - Governor
 Companionate Marriage (1928) - Mr. Williams
 Come and Get It (1929) - Judge Elliott (Jane's father)
 The Mississippi Gambler (1929) - Captain Weathers
 Skinner Steps Out (1929) - Crosby
 The Love Trader (1930) - Benson
 Sundown Trail (1931) - Pa Stoddard
 Freighters of Destiny (1931) - Tim 'Dad' Mercer
 Beyond the Rockies (1932) - Rancher Allen
 Gambling Ship (1933) - Conductor (uncredited)
 Whom the Gods Destroy (1934) - Balkan Captain (uncredited)
 One More River (1934) - Juryman (uncredited)
 Ruggles of Red Gap (1935) - Eddie (uncredited)
 Queen of the Jungle (1935) - John Lawrence
 Diamond Jim (1935) - Conductor (uncredited)
 Wanderer of the Wasteland (1935) - Man #1
 Stormy (1935) - Old Miner (uncredited)
 Cavalry (1936) - Gen. John Harvey

References

External links

1870 births
1946 deaths
American male film actors
American male silent film actors
Male actors from Philadelphia
20th-century American male actors